State Road 536 (NM 536) is a  long state highway in the US state of New Mexico. NM 536's western terminus is a dead end at Sandia Crest and the eastern terminus is in San Antonito, at NM 14.

Major intersections

See also

References

536
Transportation in Bernalillo County, New Mexico
Transportation in Sandoval County, New Mexico